Chen Ching-yu was a fiscal official and politician of the government of the Republic of China. He was from Changshu, Jiangsu. He served as the Minister of the Ministry of Finance for the Republic of China between 1963 and 1967.

Biography
First, he was a design member of the Nanjing Kuomintang Government Construction Committee. He later became the county magistrate of Lishui, Jiangsu. He was later appointed Secretary-General of the Executive Yuan, serving from 1954 to 1958.

References

1899 births
1981 deaths
Members of the Kuomintang
Kuomintang politicians in Taiwan
Taiwanese Ministers of Finance